Cockfosters Football Club is a football club based in Cockfosters in the London Borough of Enfield, England.

History
The club was established in 1921 as Cockfosters Athletic and joined the Barnet League. Cockfosters Juniors merged into the club at the start of the 1930s, and they subsequently joined the Wood Green League. They won Division Two in 1931–32 and Division One in 1933–34. The 1938–39 season saw them win the Premier Division, League Cup and Barnet Cup. Following World War II the club joined Division One of the Northern Suburban Intermediate League, and after finishing as runners-up in 1946–47, they were promoted to the Premier Division. Although they were relegated back to Division One a year later, they won Division One in 1949–50 to earn promotion back to the Premier Division. The following season saw them finish as Premier Division runners-up.

Cockfosters  won Division One again in 1960–61 and, after being promoted, were Premier Division champions the following season. In 1966 they joined Division One of the Hertfordshire Senior County League, and after winning it in their first season, they were promoted to the Premier Division. In 1968 "Athletic" was dropped from the club's name. They won the London Intermediate Cup in 1970–71, beating Clapton Reserves 2–1 in a replayed final. They won the Premier Division title in 1978–79, also winning the Herts Intermediate Cup and the league's Aubrey Cup. The club were Premier Division champions again in 1980–81 and 1983–84, and won the Aubrey Cup again in 1984–85. The 1989–90 season saw them win the London Intermediate Cup for a second time, beating Port of London Authority 1–0 in the final.

In 1990 Cockfosters moved up to the Premier Division of the Spartan League. When the league merged with the South Midlands League to form the Spartan South Midlands League in 1997, the club were placed in the Premier Division South. After finishing bottom of the division in the 1997–98 season, they were placed in the Senior Division for the following season; the division was renamed Division One in 2001. In 2006–07 Cockfosters were Division One runners-up, earning promotion to the Premier Division. The following season saw them win the league's Floodlit Cup. However, they were relegated back to Division One at the end of the 2008–09 season. The 2012–13 season saw them finish as Division One runners-up again, resulting in promotion to the Premier Division. In 2013–14 they won the league's Challenge Trophy and Floodlit Cup.

At the end of the 2018–19 season Cockfosters were transferred to the Essex Senior League.

Ground

The club have played at the Cockfosters Sports Ground on Chalk Lane since their foundation, with the site given to the club by Lady Bevan.

Honours

Spartan South Midlands League
Challenge Trophy winners 2013–14
Floodlit Cup winners 2007–08, 2013–14
Hertfordshire Senior County League
Premier Division champions 1978–79, 1980–81, 1983–84
Division One champions 1966–67
Aubrey Cup winners 1978–79, 1984–85
Northern Suburban Intermediate League
Premier Division champions 1961–62
Division One champions 1949–50, 1960–61
Wood Green League
Premier Division champions 1938–39
Division One champions 1933–34
Division Two champions 1931–32
League Cup winners 1938–39
London Intermediate Cup
Winners 1970–71, 1989–90
Herts Intermediate Cup
Winners 1978–79
Barnet Cup
Winners 1938–39, 1948–49, 1949–50, 1962–63

Records
Best FA Cup performance: First qualifying round, 2013–14, 2015–16, 2017–18
Best FA Vase performance: Second round, 1991–92, 2007–08, 2012–13, 2013–14, 2016–17
Record attendance: 408 vs Saffron Walden Town

See also
Cockfosters F.C. players

References

External links
Official website

Football clubs in England
Football clubs in London
Association football clubs established in 1921
1921 establishments in England
Sport in the London Borough of Enfield
Cockfosters
Hertfordshire Senior County League
Spartan League
Spartan South Midlands Football League
Essex Senior Football League